Transgender pregnancy is the gestation of one or more embryos or fetuses by transgender people. Currently, the possibility is restricted to those born with female reproductive systems, and transition-related treatments may impact fertility. Transgender men and nonbinary people who are or wish to become pregnant face social, medical, legal, and psychological concerns. As uterus transplantations are currently experimental, and none have successfully been performed on trans women, they cannot become pregnant.

Trans men 

Pregnancy is possible for transgender men who retain functioning ovaries and a uterus, such as in the case of Thomas Beatie. Regardless of prior hormone replacement therapy (HRT) treatments, the progression of pregnancy and birthing procedures are typically the same as those of cisgender women. It has been shown that historical HRT use may not negatively impact ovarian stimulation outcomes, with no significant differences in the markers of follicular function or oocyte maturity between transgender men with and without a history of testosterone use. However, some trans men who carry pregnancies are subjected to discrimination, which can include a variety of negative social, emotional, and medical experiences, as pregnancy is regarded as an exclusively feminine or female activity. According to the study "Transgender Men Who Experienced Pregnancy After Female-to-Male Gender Transitioning" by the American College of Obstetricians and Gynecologists, there is a lack of awareness, services, and medical assistance available to pregnant trans men. Inaccessibility to these services may lead to difficulty in finding comfortable and supportive services concerning prenatal care, as well as an increased risk for unsafe or unhealthy practices. Additionally, the study showed that some individuals reported having gender dysphoria and feelings of isolation due to the public reception of their gender identity and drastic changes in appearance which occur during pregnancy, such as enlarged breasts.

Testosterone therapy affects fertility, but many trans men who have become pregnant were able to do so within six months of stopping testosterone. Testosterone has been shown to be an ineffective form of contraception. Exposing a fetus to high levels of exogenous testosterone  may damage an unborn child. This is particularly impactful in the first trimester of development when many pregnancies haven’t been discovered yet. Additionally, patients experiencing amenorrhea (a common side effect of exogenous testosterone exposure) may experience additional challenges in identifying early pregnancies due to the lack of regular menstrual cycling that could indicate a pregnancy if missed, for example. For this reason, it is important for patients and healthcare practitioners to comprehensively discuss fertility goals, family planning and contraceptive options during gender-affirming care. Previous studies of pregnancies in women suggest that high levels of endogenous androgens are associated with reduced birth weight, although it is unclear how prior testosterone in a childbearing trans person may affect birth weight. Future pregnancies can be achieved by oophyte banking, but the process may increase gender dysphoria or may not be accessible due to lack of insurance coverage. Testosterone therapy is not a sufficient method of contraception, and trans men may experience unintended pregnancy, especially if they miss doses. Unintended pregnancies can result in transgender men or nonbinary people considering or attempting self-induced abortion. Delivery options include conventional methods such as vaginal delivery and cesarean section, and patient preference should be taken into consideration in order to reduce gender dysphoric feelings associated with certain physical changes and sensations. According to the National Transgender Discrimination Survey, postpartum rates of suicide and depression in trans individuals has been found to be higher than the adult average. This may be attributed to factors such as lack of social support, discrimination, and lack of adequate healthcare practitioner training. Another important postpartum consideration for trans men is whether to resume testosterone therapy. There is currently no evidence that testosterone enters breast milk in a significant quantity. However, elevated testosterone levels may suppress lactation and healthcare guidelines have previously recommended that trans men do not undergo testosterone therapy while chestfeeding. Trans men who undergo chest reconstruction surgery may maintain the ability to chestfeed.

Among the wide array of transgender-related therapies available, including surgical and medical interventions, some offer the option of preserving fertility while others may compromise one’s ability to become pregnant (including bilateral salpingo-oophorectomy and/or total hysterectomy).

Special consideration of the mental health of transgender people during pregnancy is important. It has previously been shown that transgender individuals often experience higher rates of suicidality than cisgender people and lesser degrees of social support from their environment and familial relationships. Relatedly, many transgender individuals experiencing pregnancy reported that choices of healthcare providers were substantially impacted by the views of the healthcare worker, and many transgender people prefer midwifery services rather than experience labor and delivery in a hospital.

Statistics 
According to figures compiled by Medicare for Australia, one of the few national surveys as of 2020, 75 male-identified people gave birth naturally or via C-section in the country in 2016, and 40 in 2017.

Non-binary people
Non-binary people with a functioning female reproductive system can give birth.  Non-binary people who are assigned female at birth are more likely than binary trans people to become pregnant since they are less likely to seek gender-affirming medical procedures that interfere with their fertility.

Not all non-binary people (or trans people of any gender identity) medically transition through hormone replacement therapy (HRT) or any kind of surgeries due to various factors ranging from medical conditions, accessibility and/or expenses, but those that do have to interrupt their HRT in order to carry the pregnancy. Unintended pregnancies by non-binary people on testosterone therapy may be more common if they are on a low dose of testosterone. Non-binary parents choose whether to be called "mom" or "dad", or to utilize newly-coined gender-neutral or non-binary titles.

Non-binary people who have written or been profiled about their experiences of pregnancy include Rory Mickelson, Braiden Schirtzinger, and Mariah MacCarthy.

Trans women  

Pregnancy is not possible for transgender women as they lack a female reproductive system. As of 2019, uterus transplantation has not been successfully performed in transgender women. The Danish transgender painter Lili Elbe died in 1931 from surgical complications following an attempt at such an operation.  

Uterine transplantation, or UTx, is in its infancy and is not yet publicly available. As of 2019, in cisgender women, more than 42 UTx procedures had been performed, with 12 live births resulting from the transplanted uteruses as of publication. The International Society of Uterine Transplantation (ISUTx) was established internationally in 2016, with 70 clinical doctors and scientists, and currently has 140 intercontinental delegates. 

In 2012, McGill University published the "Montreal Criteria for the Ethical Feasibility of Uterine Transplantation", a proposed set of criteria for carrying out uterine transplants, in Transplant International. Under these criteria, and because no research has been conducted in non-females, only a genetic female could ethically be considered a transplant recipient. The exclusion of trans women from candidacy is justified by the lack of research to determine how to conduct the surgery, rather than an inherent bar.

Society and culture 

In 1583, an intersex person that had masculine gender expression reportedly became pregnant in Beaumaris, Wales. 

Unicode introduced "pregnant man" and "pregnant person" emojis in version 14.0, approved September 2021.

See also
 Transgender rights
 LGBT parenting
 LGBT reproduction
 Male pregnancy

References

Transgender and medicine
Human pregnancy
LGBT parenting
Trans men
Trans women